Incepta Pharmaceuticals Limited is a Bangladeshi pharmaceutical company based in Dhaka that manufactures and markets generic drugs. Abdul Muktadir is the chairman of the company.

History 
Incepta was established in Dhaka, Bangladesh in 1999. The company has a manufacturing facility located at Zirabo, Savar. A second larger manufacturing facility has been built in Dhamrai.

The company sells its products in Bangladesh and also has begun exporting to both developed and developing countries around the world. The company is now concentrating its efforts in the area of export of Biological products like GCSF, EPO, Adalimumab, and vaccines.

In 2015, Incepta launched a generic version of sofosbuvir (Hopetavir) in the local Bangladeshi market. 

In 2016, Incepta signed a deal with Bioengineering and German AMS Technology for a joint venture.

Sponsorship
The company own the sponsorship rights of Rangpur Rangers for the 2019–20 Bangladesh Premier League.

References

External links
 Official Website 

Bangladeshi brands
Pharmaceutical companies of Bangladesh
Pharmaceutical companies established in 1999
Generic drug manufacturers
Manufacturing companies based in Dhaka
Bangladeshi companies established in 1999